Mira Żelechower-Aleksiun (born 26 March 1941 in Millerovo) is a Polish painter of Jewish descent.

Biography 
She was born in Millerovo, Rostov Oblast, where her parents moved during World War II. Her father was murdered by Nazis in May 1941. After the war Mira Żelechower and her mother came back to Poland and settled in Wrocław.

In 1966 she graduated from Eugeniusz Geppert Academy of Fine Arts and one year later, she has debuted as a painter at the "Galeria Teatru Kalambur" in Wrocław. In the 1960s and the 1970s Mira Żelechower-Aleksiun was taking part in the important painters' conferences, including 4th and 7th Overview of the Polish Contemporary Art in Szczecin, 8th and 9th Group of Realists' Exhibition in Warsaw and Jan Spychalski Painting Contest in Poznań.

References 

1941 births
Living people
20th-century Polish painters
20th-century Polish women artists
21st-century Polish painters
21st-century Polish women artists
Artists from Wrocław
Polish people of Jewish descent
People from Millerovsky District
Polish women painters